Mangar Bani, a paleolithic archaeological site and sacred grove hill forest next to the Mangar village on Delhi-Haryana border,which is dominated by Gurjar community;is in the South Delhi Ridge of Aravalli mountain range in Faridabad tehsil of Faridabad district in the Indian state of Haryana. It lies, immediate south of India's national capital Delhi, within NCR.This whole area is dominated by Gurjar Community.

It is Indian subcontinent's largest neolithic South Asian Stone Age site and tool making factory dating back to 100,000 years Before Present (BP), first ever such site with cave painting in Aravalli range dating back to 20,000-40,000 BP, making it the oldest human habitation discovered in Haryana and Delhi NCR.

Contiguous to Asola Bhatti Wildlife Sanctuary, it is an important biodiversity area within the Northern Aravalli leopard wildlife corridor stretching from Sariska Tiger Reserve to Delhi with several wetlands, formed in the abandoned open pit mines in and around the area and have significance for the migratory birds, are Badkhal Lake, 10th century ancient Surajkund reservoir and Anangpur Dam, Damdama Lake, Tughlaqabad Fort and Adilabad ruins (both in Delhi).

There are concerns for its destruction due to littering, encroachment and illegal construction in the nearby area. Activists have been demanding that government must implement a wide-ranging conservation plan, legally declare this area as the protected forest and protected archaeological site, and have it listed among the UNESCO World Heritage Sites of India.

Background

Location 

Mangar Bani and other villages such as Gwal Pahari and Bandhwari, lie in the eco-sensitive area of at-risk forested hills of Southern Delhi Ridge in Aravali range. Mangar Bani, adjacent to Mangar village, is a much larger forested area. It is 19 km east of Gurugaon DLF Phase I, 24 km northeast of Damdama Lake, 14 km west of Badkhal Lake,   22 km from Old Faridabad metro station and 28 km southwest of Okhla Industrial Estate.

Etymology 

Mangar Bani, is a Haryanvi dialect term which means the "Mangar Vana" in Hindi or Sanskrit and "the Mangar Forest" in English.

History

Mangar Bani forest is a neolithic site with stone tools and rock art dating back to 100,000 years Before Present (BP) and cave paintings dating back to 20,000-40,000 BP.

Mangar is a 700 years old village nestled in the rocky hills covered with native trees unique to the Aravalli range, the oldest Plateau mountains in India.

Village

Administration 

Mangar is governed by the panchayat local governing body.The village is dominated by Harsana clan of Gurjar Community.

Demography 

In 2011, it had a population of about 1965 persons living in 368 households.

Tribal jewellery museum

Mangar Tribal Jewellery museum, established by the Sterre Sharma the wife of former INC union minister Satish Sharma, has jewellery from all over India including the tribes of northeast India. Jewellery is made from the glass, bone, brass, white metal, silver and gold plate.

Ecology

Significance 

Mangar Bani has been studied by the biologists who found it to be a High-Biodiversity Zone. It is one of the last remaining natural tropical forest in the Aravalli range. It has more than 30 native tree species thriving along with the 100 native shrubs and herbs, all of which provide shelter to the wildlife, animals and rare birds, leopards. It acts as an important source of ground water recharge. It is an important biodiversity area, sacred grove, leopard and migratory birds habitat, and part of the Northern Aravalli leopard wildlife corridor with several wetlands.

Mangar Bani hills biodiversity area 

Mangar Bani along with neighbouring villages of Gwal Pahari, Baliawas and Bandhwari, which lies near the forested parts of Southern Delhi Ridge of Aravalli range, is an ecologically sensitive under threat biodiversity area dotted with disused mining pits. The flora, fauna, and ecology has degraded which severely needs restoration by replacing the invasive Vilayati kikar weed with the 3-layer cover of native grass, shrubs and trees. This area lies in the habitat of leopards. 95% of the forest is covered with the slow-growing dhau tree (anogeissus pendula). Mangar Bani has native plant species such as Dhau and wild eagle can be seen here.

Leopard habitat and wildlife corridor 

Mangar Bani is an important leopard habitat and it also lies within the Northern Aravalli leopard wildlife corridor stretching from Sariska Tiger Reserve to Delhi.

Sacred grove surrounding Gudariya Das Baba temple 

Mangar bani is sacred grove as it surrounds Gudariya Das Baba temple, which is within Mangar Bani forest and lies is 2 km to the northwest of Mangar village. This ancient temple provides the status of sacred grove to Mangar Bani. According to the local oral tradition, the baba (saint) Gudariya Das protects this bani (forest) and punishes anyone who damages this forest.

Wetlands: Lulu Lake 

Lulu Lake wetland is nestled on the hills of Mangar Bani, 6 km to the southwest of Mangar village and 4 km south of Gudariya Das Baba temple. Its near mount Gaga Lulu, a small hill.

Prehistoric stone age sites

Significance 

Spread over 5000 ha, this is the largest pre-historic site and Stone Age tool making factory in the Indian subcontinent, first ever site discovered in the Aravalli range with cave paintings. The stone tools and rock art dating back to 100,000 years BP and cave paintings date back to 20,000-40,000 BP. This is also the oldest human habitation discovered in Haryana and Delhi NCR. Findings push back the history of the pushing it back the anthropogenic (human) history of Haryana and NCR by several thousand years.

It is the forest area where cave paintings and tools from the paleolithic period were discovered. Archaeologists discovered cave paintings in Mangarbani hill forest in May 2021; the tools found at the site are estimated to be 100,000 years old. It is likely the largest paleolithic site in the Indian subcontinent and this is the first time cave paintings have been found ion aravalli. According to Haryana Archaeology and Museums Department, "On the basis of this exploration, it can be said that this may be one of the biggest Palaeolithic sites in the Indian sub-continent, where stone age tools were recovered from different open-air sites as well as from rock shelters. Though tools from the Palaeolithic Age have been identified earlier in parts of the Aravallis, it is for the first time that cave paintings and rock art of a large magnitude have been found in Haryana."

Another archaeological important site in Aravalli is Khanak, a copper mine and copper smelter belonging to the Indus Valley civilization (IVC) period in Tosham Hill range.

Number of scattered sites 

Mangar Bani is spread across 5000 ha only and it is surrounded by several hundred times larger forested Aravali range. In June 2021, a 3-day survey identified several scattered neolithic sites within Mangar Bani alone. As of July 2021, Haryana Archaeological dept had plan to survey the entire Mangar Bani.

Similar group of 43 paleolithic sites with microliths tools and rock art was found on an axis from Ankhir (a village 17 km east of Mangar Bani) in south to north along Anangpur-Angnpur Dam-Surajkund-Tughlaqabad. These sites are on the 'Tughlaqabad-Surajkund Road' and south of 'Surajkund-Faridabad Road', on Anangpur hills, and on Ankhir hill, and on the road embracing the low ridge from Faridabad (Ankhir) to Surajkund. From a study of the prehistoric findings along the ridges of Surajkund reservoir, Anagpur Dam, and around Delhi and adjoining parts of Haryana, it has been inferred that the southern hilly area of Delhi and Haryana was environmentally suited for pre-historic man to settle here.

Findings

Middle Paleolithic era: Stone tools factory 

In the midst of the Mangar bani forest in the high hills area, the archeologists also discovered some tools that belong to the Palaeothic period. Stone age tools are found in various outdoor locations and rock shelters.

Middle Paleolithic era: Cave paintings 

Cave painting is a type of rock art that includes petroglyphs, or engravings, found on the wall or ceilings of caves. Mangarbani hill forest is a Palaeolithic site with rock art as well as cave paintings. It is believed to be the largest in the Indian subcontinent and possibly the world's oldest.

Upper Paleolithic rock art 

Pattern of rock art drawing had evolved, some being older and simpler line drawings when "when humans hadn't really figured out how to draw complex patterns", which later evolved into more refined patterns such as "different geometric shapes, foliage, animals and human figures" including cup marks like symbols presumably for some special purpose for the inhabitants of that era. Most paintings are ochre colored (see also Ochre Coloured Pottery culture which is unrelated to the site and dates to much later era), but there white paintings which indicates that both belong to different historic eras. Study of these will help ascertain how "early humans developed their tool making skills".

Conservation and further research 

This is the first time a discovery of the same kind has been made in the Aravali range in Haryana. Though mining destroyed many of the associated caves and hills, the area is vast, and there is much to discover. As of July 2021, entire South Ride of Aravalli in Haryana will be mapped, further research and documentation will be carried out, including radiocarbon dating to precisely determine age of the findings which will help in ascertaining which aspects belong to the Upper Paleolithic (early paleolithic) and which to the Lower Paleolithic (early paleolithic) era.

As of 31 July 2021, Head of HAD, Ashok Khemka, informed that proposal to notify this area as protected archaeological site has been sent by Haryana Archaeological Dept (HAD) to Govt of Haryana (GoH), and HAD is awaiting gazette notification by the GoH after which this site will become legally protected. Meanwhile, district land and revenue administration of Faridabad was undertaking ground truthing exercise, to verify the data, to ascertain the landscape and confirm the type and ownership of the land, which will be sent to HAD to help with attainment of protected status and consequent conservation. Activists have demanded the protected status for the entire South Ridge and not just the Mangar Bani.

Khemka asserted that HAD will engage National Research Laboratory for Conservation of Cultural Property (NRLC) Lucknow, Birbal Sahni Institute of Palaeosciences (BSIP) Lucknow, Physical Research Laboratory (PRL) Ahmedabad for conservation of rockart and paintings. Khemka asserted that the whole area will be extensively surveyed to find any additional sites, entire area of Delhi South Ridge of Aravali in Haryana between Gurugram and Faridabad will be mapped and each site will be GPS tagged. Large scale scientific excavations, scientific dating of paintings and excavated sediments will be undertaken. Earlier, in 1986, rock paintings were found at 43 sites in the area of historic Anangpur village (capital of Anangpal Tomar (Anangpal II) of Tomara dynasty c.736- 1052 CE who also built Delhi's Lal Kot before they were overthrown by Chahamanas of Shakambhari, last king of Chahamanas or Chauhans was Prithviraj Chauhan), Mangar Bani site might be an extension of the Anangpur Group of Paleolithic Sites.

Concerns and conservation

Threats

Encroachments, illegal logging and construction 

Encroachment, illegal tree felling, illegal construction are major threats to the forest. Nearby Bandhwari Waste-to-energy plant and landfill is already causing an environmental threat to the sensitive ecology by leeching toxic pollutants in the forest and aquifers. In 2017, National Green Tribunal (NGT) ordered the Central Pollution Control Board (CPCB) to the test the groundwater sample near Bandhwari plant.

Littering and vandalism 

As of July 2021, the site was unprotected both in terms of physical security as well as legal forests and archaeological status. Site is littered with trash, such as empty beer bottles, cola cans, cigarette butts, wrappers of snacks. As the more people visit this unsecured and vulnerable site, which is also exposed to the weather and erosion, will expedite the deterioration of site.

Conservation

Unprotected legal status 

Mangar Bani, which was panchayat common land till 1970 was converted to private land in the 1980s, and in 2012 the union environment ministry put the Mangar Development plan on hold. Though as early as 2015, Chief Minister of Haryana, Manohar Lal Khattar, had announced that Mangar Bani will be declared a protected forest with a 500-meter buffer zone, as of July 2021, with its at-risk ecology, yet to be protected under the Forests Act.

Demand for protected forest and archaeological site status 

As of July 2021, the site was unprotected both in terms of physical security as well as legal forests and archaeological status. Site is littered with trash, such as empty beer bottles, cola cans, cigarette butts, wrappers of snacks. As the more people visit this unsecured and vulnerable site, which is also exposed to the weather and erosion, will expedite the deterioration of site. Both, the officials of Haryana Archaeological Department and wildlife activists, agree that the forests of Mangar Bani and Gurgaon-Faridabad Aravalli must be legally declared a heritage-eco zone to ensure the area is protected from illegal mining and encroachment. Sunil Harsana, the wildlife activist who discovered the site underscores this by saying, "The site needs urgent protection. You never know who will visit the site and carve their name or ‘hearts’ alongside the prehistoric carvings, just for the fun of it." Director of Haryana Archaeological Department said "We don't even know how many of these sites must have been destroyed because of mining and exploitation of the Aravallis. They need urgent protection. As the oldest mountain range in the world, they carry important clues to help us understand our origins and have a lot of stories to tell about the Indian subcontinent."

Future conservation plan, heritage and eco-tourism

With a conservation plan, site can be developed for heritage and eco-tourism, providing economic and employment opportunities for the residents of the area. Ashok Khemka, Principal Secretary to Haryana government, said in early July that the Haryana Archaeological Department will legally protected by "issuing orders to protect Mangar Bani under Section 4 of the Punjab Ancient and Historical Monuments and Archaeological Sites and Remains Act, 1964, and that experts in paleolithic cave paintings will be carrying out an extensive survey of the area."

There are demands by activists to prepare and implement a time-bound conservation plan, with the fixed accountability of the concerned officials, to have it declared as the UNESCO World Heritage Site.

See also

 Mesolithic archaeological sites 
 Anangpur caves (Faridabad) 
 Bhimbetka rock shelters (Bhopal) 
 Pahargarh caves (Morena)

 Biodiversity and ecology
 Gurugram Leopard and Deer Safari
 Leopards of Haryana
 National Parks & Wildlife Sanctuaries of Haryana

 History and culture 
 Haryana Tourism
 List of State Protected Monuments in Haryana
 List of Monuments of National Importance in Haryana
 Potential UNESCO World Heritage Sites in India
 Surajkund International Crafts Mela
 Tourism in Haryana

References

External links 
 Haryana Forest Department
 

Archaeology in Haryana
Caves containing pictograms in India
Monuments of National Importance in Haryana
History of Haryana
Indian painting
 
Wildlife sanctuaries in Haryana
Protected areas of Haryana
Tourist attractions in Haryana
Ridges of India
Aravalli Range
Faridabad district